Abramovo is a rural locality (a selo) and the administrative center of Abramovsky Selsoviet of Arzamassky District, Nizhny Novgorod Oblast, Russia. The population was 1383 as of 2010. There are 16 streets.

Geography 
Abramovo is located 12 km west of Arzamas (the district's administrative centre) by road. Merlino is the nearest rural locality.

References 

Rural localities in Nizhny Novgorod Oblast
Arzamassky District
Arzamassky Uyezd